John Patrick Flynn (February 10, 1954 – December 4, 2021) was a former bank manager and political figure in New Brunswick, Canada. He represented York in the Legislative Assembly of New Brunswick from 1995 to 1999 as a Liberal member.

He was born in Saint Margarets, New Brunswick, the son of Thomas J. Flynn and Geraldine Daley. He was first married to Bonnie Vincent, and second to Heike Flynn. Flynn was defeated when he ran for reelection in 1999.

He died on December 4, 2021 in Fredericton, New Brunswick, after a brief battle with cancer.

References 

 Canadian Parliamentary Guide, 1997, Kathryn O'Handley 

1954 births
2021 deaths
New Brunswick Liberal Association MLAs
People from Northumberland County, New Brunswick